Tarsus: World Beyond the Frontier is a 1983 tabletop role-playing game adventure, written by Marc W. Miller and Loren K. Wiseman, with a cover by David Deitrick for Traveller published by Game Designers' Workshop. One of the classic Traveller Modules series.

Plot summary
Tarsus is the first in a series of boxed modules to be companion to Traveller Starter Edition, and the adventures take place on the planet Tarsus.

Reception
Andy Slack reviewed Tarsus for White Dwarf #50, giving it an overall rating of 9 out of 10, and stated that "Tarsus is an excellent adventure for the beginning band - either of new players or of new characters - but considering the time it took me to sort it out, it may be too complex for new GMs. I refrain from giving it an overall 10 because of the lack of adequate cross-referencing and weather tables, and inconsistent hex numbering on the subsector map."

Frederick Paul Kiesche III reviewed Tarsus in Space Gamer No. 68. Kiesche commented that "Tarsus (and the concepts behind it) are an exciting new area to be explored in the Traveller universe. I am looking forward to more modules such as this one [...] There's nothing like injecting new blood into an already-lively universe."

In a retrospective review of Tarsus: World Beyond the Frontier in Black Gate, John ONeill said "Tarsus isn't meant to be a fully fleshed-out adventure pack in the modern sense. It's more of what we'd call a sandbox setting today — a cleverly designed setting that doesn't require players to follow a script to have fun, but rather encourages them to pursue their own interests, and has lots of rewards for players who do just that."

Reviews
 Different Worlds #34 (May/June, 1984)

See also
 Classic Traveller Modules

References

Role-playing game supplements introduced in 1983
Traveller (role-playing game) adventures